Panagia Galaktotrofousa monastery (Greek: Ιερά Μονή Παναγίας Γαλακτοτροφούσας) is a small Christian Orthodox monastery dedicated to the Virgin Mary and located in Kofinou, Cyprus.

In 2012 there were only three monks living in the monastery. The monastery consists of dormitories, a church in the courtyard and some furnished rooms used as an exhibition space. One of the rooms shows the history of the monastery and another room includes a showcase cabinet with the ossicles of the founder of the monastery. The monks make a living by producing and selling olive oil.

Image gallery 

Google Maps

Cypriot Orthodox monasteries
Greek Orthodox monasteries
Template:Monasteries of Cyprus